Little Bear may refer to:

People
 Little Bear (Native American leader), 19th century Cree leader who participated in the 1885 North-West Rebellion
 Danny Little Bear (1926–1991), American professional wrestler
 nickname of Chester Zardis (1900–1990), American jazz bassist

Places
 Little Bear Mountain, a volcano in British Columbia, Canada
 Little Bear Lake (Saskatchewan), Canada
 Little Bear Peak, Colorado
 Little Bear River, Utah
 Little Bear Brook, New Jersey

Entertainment
 Little Bear series (1957 to 1968), children's picture books written by Else Holmelund Minarik and illustrated by Maurice Sendak
 Little Bear (TV series), a children's TV series based upon the books
 The Little Bear Movie, a direct-to-DVD film
 Little Bear (film), short Irish drama film directed by Daire Glynn and Ger Duffy
 Little Bear series (1988 to 2005), children's picture books written by Martin Waddell and illustrated by Barbara Firth
 "Little Bear" (song), by indie band Guillemots
 The title character in The Indian in the Cupboard, a book

Other uses
 Henderson Little Bear, an American Piper "Cub" replica
 Ursa Minor, also known as Little Bear, a constellation
 Little Bear (train), a former mixed passenger/freight train operated by the Ontario Northland Railway
 Little Bear Fire, a wildfire that began in New Mexico on June 4, 2012
 Little bear or Acronicta lupini, a moth of the family Noctuidae

See also
 The Little Bears, probably the first American comic strip with recurring characters